is a Japanese football player and manager.

Playing career
Hayashi was born in Tsu on July 29, 1976. After graduating from Chuo University, he joined to newly was promoted to J2 League club, FC Tokyo in 1999. In 2000, he moved to newly was promoted to J2 club, Mito HollyHock. On June 14, 2000, he debuted in J.League Cup (v Shimizu S-Pulse). He moved to CFE in 2002 and played until the end of the 2003 season.

Coaching career
In 2013, Hayashi became a goalkeeper coach for L.League club Iga FC Kunoichi. In September 2014, he became a manager as Tetsuya Asano successor. He managed the club until the end of the 2014 season.

Club statistics

References

External links

1976 births
Living people
Chuo University alumni
Association football people from Mie Prefecture
Japanese footballers
J2 League players
FC Tokyo players
Mito HollyHock players
Japanese football managers
Association football goalkeepers